The Zbroyar Z-008 is a series of sniper rifles manufactured by Zbroyar.

The basic models of the Z-008 series are Tactical, Tactical Pro, Hunting, Hunting Pro, Varmint, and Benchrest. Almost every rifle produced by the company is made to order, with the design changes required by the customer.

References

7.62×51mm NATO battle rifles
Sniper rifles of Ukraine
Weapons and ammunition introduced in 2007